Dicerca obscura is a species of brownish-black coloured beetle from Chrysochroinae subfamily which is found in central and eastern USA and Canada, where it feeds on various persimmon species (including Diospyros virginiana) and staghorn sumac.

References

External links
Image of Dicerca obscura on BugGuide

Beetles described in 1781
Endemic fauna of the United States
Buprestidae